Natuwadi Dam, is an earthfill dam on Tr.of Charti river near Khed, Ratnagiri district in the state of Maharashtra in India.

Specifications

Purpose
 Irrigation

See also
 Dams in Maharashtra
 List of reservoirs and dams in India

References

Dams in Ratnagiri district
Dams completed in 1984
1984 establishments in Maharashtra